The 2012 Summit League baseball tournament took place from May 24 through 26.  The top four regular season finishers of the league's seven teams met in the double-elimination tournament held at Oral Roberts University's J. L. Johnson Stadium.  Oral Roberts won their fifteenth consecutive championship, claiming the tournament title every year but one of the sixteen seasons that they have been in the league, and will represent The Summit League in the 2012 NCAA Division I baseball tournament.

Seeding
The top four finishers from the regular season will be seeded one through four.

Results

All-Tournament Team
The following players were named to the All-Tournament Team.

Most Valuable Player
Drew Bowen was named Tournament Most Valuable Player.  Bowen played for Oral Roberts and earned the save in the championship game.

References

Tournament
Summit League Baseball Tournament
Summit League baseball tournament
Summit League baseball tournament